Così è (se vi pare) is a 1917 Italian play by Luigi Pirandello.

Così è (se vi pare) may also refer to:
Così è (se vi pare) (1954 film), an Italian film from 1954
Così è (se vi pare) (1958 film), an Italian film from 1958
Così è (se vi pare) (1974 film), an Italian film from 1974
Così è (se vi pare) (1986 film), an Italian film from 1986

See also
Così (disambiguation)